Peter J. James (born 22 August 1948) is a British writer of crime fiction. He was born in Brighton, the son of Cornelia James, the former glovemaker to Queen Elizabeth II.

Education and early career

James was educated at Charterhouse and went on to Ravensbourne Film School. For a brief period of time whilst at film school, James worked as Orson Welles's house cleaner. Subsequently, he spent several years in North America, working as a screenwriter and film producer, beginning in Canada in 1970 working first as a gofer, then writer, on the children's television series Polka Dot Door.

Personal life

His interests include criminology, religion, science and the paranormal, as well as food and wine. He has written many restaurant columns. He is also a self-confessed "petrol head," having owned many fast cars over the years, including four Aston Martins, AMG and Brabus Mercedes, a Bentley Continental GT Speed and two classic Jaguar E-Types.  He holds an international racing licence, and has in the past competed in the Britcar series in both a Honda Accord and a former British Touring Car Championship SEAT Toledo. His 1965 BMW 1800 Ti, with his co-driver Steve Soper, came 10th overall in the St Mary's Trophy in the Goodwood Revival in 2013. James currently races a 1962 C1 Corvette and a 1964 Mini Cooper S. He has donated two police cars to Sussex Police, which bear his name, and a police car to States of Jersey Police.

He is married to Lara James (m. 2015). His first, 19-year marriage was to Georgina Wilkin, from 1979 until 1998.

In January 1999, James was diagnosed with type 2 diabetes.

Work

Literature
James has written 36 novels, including the International best-selling crime thriller series featuring Brighton-based Detective Superintendent Roy Grace, which have sold 21 million copies worldwide and have given him 19 consecutive UK Sunday Times number ones, as well as number ones in Germany, France, Russia and Canada, and he is also a New York Times best-seller. James's books have been translated into 38 languages. In the UK and US they are published by Macmillan Publishers.  In 1993 Penguin Books published his novel Host on two floppy discs (in addition to conventional print formats).  It has been called the world's first electronic novel and a copy of it is in the Science Museum. James has written supernatural thrillers, spy fiction, science-based thrillers, a children's novel, and the novella The Perfect Murder, which was 15 weeks at number one on iBooks and 45 weeks in their top 10, was adapted by Shaun McKenna into a stage play which had a smash hit tour in 2014 and returned to stage in 2016. Subsequent stage adaptations of his novels, all also by Shaun McKenna,  include Dead Simple, Not Dead Enough and The House on Cold Hill have also had sell-out national tours.  His fifth stage adaptation, Looking Good Dead starts on a national tour in March 2021. The Roy Grace series is currently being produced by ITV with John Simm playing the role of Roy Grace.  His novel Perfect People is also being filmed as an eight-part mini-series in 2021.  James has served two consecutive terms as chairman of the Crime Writers' Association, and was the programming chair for the Theakston's Old Peculier Crime Writing Festival in 2016, part of the Harrogate International Festivals portfolio.  He hosts The Author’s Studio, a free online learning facility for all budding authors, on his YouTube channel.

In 2017, James wrote the foreword for the UK edition of The Crime Book, with American crime author Cathy Scott writing the foreword for the US edition. The nonfiction book, a volume in the Big Ideas Simply Explained series, was released by Dorling Kindersley (Penguin Random House) in April 2017 in the UK and May 2017 in the US.

Film
James has been involved in 26 movies in writer and/or producing roles. His 1993 novel Host was adapted into the 1998 television movie Virtual Obsession. Other films on which he is credited include: Children Shouldn't Play with Dead Things, The Neptune Factor, Blue Blood, Malachi's Cove, The Blockhouse starring Peter Sellers, Spanish Fly starring Terry-Thomas and Leslie Phillips, A Different Loyalty starring Sharon Stone, The Bridge of San Luis Rey starring Robert De Niro, and The Statement starring Michael Caine.

In 2005 The Merchant of Venice, directed by Michael Radford and for which James was executive producer, had a royal premiere in the presence of Prince Charles and received a BAFTA Award nomination. In 2006 the film also won the Silver Ribbon for Best Production Design (Migliore Scenografia) from the Italian National Syndicate of Film Journalists.

Television
His 1992 novel Prophecy was adapted into the first episode of the 1995 Chiller tv series. Since 2021, his Roy Grace series has been adapted into the ITV series Grace, starring John Simm.

Other work
James is patron of the Sussex Police Charitable Trust, patron of Brighton & Hove Samaritans, patron of the Brighton Greyhound Owners Association Retired Greyhound Trust, patron of Brighton and Hove Independent Mediation Service, patron of Relate in Sussex, patron of Terrys Cross House, patron of Little Green Pig, national co-patron of Neighbourhood Watch, co-patron of Sussex Crimestoppers, honorary patron for the South Mid Sussex Community First Responders, vice-president of The Old Police Cells Museum in Brighton. He is an ambassador for the University of Brighton, and a Martlets Hospice Champion (which he also supports through his annual Peter James Golf Classic). He supports Action Medical Research.  He also supports and works with The Reading Agency, a charity with a mission to give everyone an equal chance in life by helping people become confident and enthusiastic readers.

Awards
1967 Charterhouse school poetry prize
1969 Esquire Magazine International College Film Festival, The Island
1974 Sitges International Horror Film Festival, Best Foreign Film for Dead of Night
1999 Honorary Fellowship, FHS Emeritus award by the Hypnotherapy Society
2000 Public Awareness of Science Award, runner up, Alchemist
2004 BAFTA nomination for The Merchant of Venice
2004 Rose D'Or nomination at the Montreux Television Festival, Bedsitcom
2005 Krimi-Blitz, Best Crime Writer of the year in Germany
2006 Le Prix Polar International, Comme Une Tombe (French translation of Dead Simple)
2007 Le Prix Cœur Noir at the Saint-Quentin-en-Yvelines festival, Comme Une Tombe (French translation of Dead Simple)
2007 Richard & Judy Galaxy British Book Awards – Crime Thriller of the Year, shortlisted, Looking Good Dead
2007 Prix SNCF du Polar, shortlisted, La Mort Leur Va Si Bien (French translation of Looking Good Dead)
2007 Le Grand Prix de littérature policère, shortlisted, La Mort Leur Va Si Bien (French translation of Looking Good Dead)
2008 Theakston's Old Peculier Crime Novel of the Year Award, shortlisted, Not Dead Enough
2008 ITV Crime Thriller Author of the Year, shortlisted, Not Dead Enough
2009 Theakston's Old Peculier Crime Novel of the Year Award, shortlisted, Dead Man's Footsteps
2009 CWA Dagger in the Library, shortlisted
2009 Honorary Doctorate of Letters at the University of Brighton
2010 Sounds of Crime Award, best abridged and unabridged novel, Dead Tomorrow
2010 Galaxy British Book Awards – Sainsbury Popular Fiction Book of the Year shortlisted, Dead Like You
2010 Quick Reads Readers' Favourite Award, The Perfect Murder
2011 Sounds of Crime Award, best abridged and unabridged novel, Dead Like You
2011 ITV3 Crime Thriller Awards Winner, People's Bestseller Dagger for Crime Novel of the Year
2011 Barry Award, winner, Dead Man's Grip
2012 Wellcome Trust Book Prize, shortlisted, Perfect People
2012 Sussex Police, Outstanding Public Service Award
2012 Specsavers National Book Awards, Crime Thriller of the Year, shortlisted, Perfect People
2013 Argus Outstanding Contribution to Sussex Award
2013 Specsavers National Book Awards, Crime Thriller of the Year 2013 – shortlisted – Dead Man's Time
2014 Sainsbury's eBook of the Year Award – Winner – Want You Dead
2015 WHSmith. The Best Crime Author of all Time – Winner
2015 Honorary Mastership of the Open University
2015 Dagger in the Library UK Crime Writers' Association award for an author's body of work in British libraries (UK) shortlisted
2015 Dead Good Readers Dr Lecter Award for Scariest Villain – Winner – You Are Dead
2016 CWA Diamond Dagger Award Recipient
2016 Dead Good Readers Tess Gerritsen Award for Best Series – Winner – Roy Grace
2017 CAMEO Award – Book To Stage Category – shortlist – Not Dead Enough
2017 Poland – Lubimyczytac.pl Book Of The Year award, Horror Category – Winner – The House On Cold Hill
2017 Germany – Rheinbach Glass Dagger Award for Crime Fiction – Winner
2017 Sussex Life Hero at the Celebration of Sussex Life – Winner
2018 Specsavers Honorary Platinum Award for book sales over 5 million
2018 Specsavers National Book Awards – Audiobook Of The Year – Shortlist – Absolute Proof
2021 Specsavers Crimefest  - Audible Sounds of Crime Award nominee - Find them Dead
2021 Brighton & Hove Business Awards - Outstanding Brightonian of the Year Award

Bibliography
Roy Grace Novels
Dead Simple (2005)
Looking Good Dead (2006)
Not Dead Enough (2007)
Dead Man's Footsteps (2008)
Dead Tomorrow (2009)
Dead Like You (2010)
Dead Man's Grip (2011)
Not Dead Yet (2012)
Dead Man's Time (2013)
Want You Dead (2014)
You Are Dead (2015)
Love You Dead (2016)
Need You Dead (2017)
Dead If You Don't (2018)
Dead At First Sight (2019)
Find Them Dead (2020)
Left You Dead (2021)
Wish You Were Dead (2021)
Picture You Dead (2022)

Other Novels
Dead Letter Drop (1981)
Atom Bomb Angel (1982)
Billionaire (1983)
Travelling Man (1984)
Biggles: The Untold Story (1986)
Possession (1988)
Dreamer (1989)
Sweet Heart (1990)
Twilight (1991)
Prophecy (1992)
Host (1993)
Alchemist (1996)
Getting Wired (1996)
The Truth (1997)
Denial (1998)
Faith (2000)
The Perfect Murder (2010) (novella)
Perfect People (2011)
A Twist of the Knife (2014) (short story collection)
The House on Cold Hill (2015)
Absolute Proof (2018)
The Secret of Cold Hill (2019)
I Follow You (2020)

Non-fiction
Death Comes Knocking – Policing Roy Grace's Brighton (2016)
Babes in the Wood (2020)

See also

References

External links

Peter James Personal website
Review of Dead Man's Grip in Shots Mag Ezine May 2011
Interview with Peter James in Shots Mag Ezine October 2010
Peter James on TheCrimeHouse.com Interview published 21 June 2010
The Deckchair Interview Interview with James by Sarah Hutchings dated 25 May 2007
Peter James website about the novel Dreamer
Crime writer Peter James Interview with James in the Sussex Express
Sixty seconds with Peter James... Interview with James on ReviewingTheEvidence.com

BBC raw Quick Reads – The Perfect Murder by Peter James
ABC Talks To: Crime author Peter James Interview with James by the American Book Center in Amsterdam
Review of Peter James's thriller 'Dead Like You' by Patrick Anderson in The Washington Post 19 December 2010
Website for The Perfect Murder stage production and tour.

1948 births
20th-century English novelists
21st-century English novelists
English crime fiction writers
English mystery writers
English film producers
English thriller writers
English screenwriters
English male screenwriters
English spy fiction writers
English children's writers
People educated at Charterhouse School
Living people
People from Brighton
English people of Jewish descent
English male novelists
20th-century English male writers
21st-century English male writers
Barry Award winners
Cartier Diamond Dagger winners